Astrid Lambrecht (born 20 January 1967) is a German physicist who is Director at Forschungszentrum Jülich. She previously worked as the Deputy Director of the French National Centre for Scientific Research Institute of Physics.

Early life and education 
Lambrecht was born in Mülheim. She completed her undergraduate studies in physics at the University of Duisburg-Essen and Imperial College London. At Imperial College, she worked alongside Peter Knight. She moved to Paris for her doctoral research, studying quantum fluctuations of cold atoms at the Kastler–Brossel Laboratory. Based in the laboratory of Elisabeth Giacobino, she used an optical cavity and magneto-optic trap to study quantum noise. She was a postdoctoral researcher at the Max Planck Institute of Quantum Optics. Lambrecht completed her habilitation at the Pierre and Marie Curie University.

Research and career 
Lambrecht was appointed to the Institute of Physics at  research leader at the French National Centre for Scientific Research, where she studied quantum fluctuations in cold matter. In particular, she worked on the Casimir effect. The Casimir effect is exploited in microelectromechanical systems. At the same time, Lambrecht demonstrated that the Casimir effect has fundamental impacts in biology and chemistry. In 2014, she was made deputy director of the Kastler–Brossel Laboratory, and in 2016, Deputy Scientific Director at the CNRS headquarters. She was nominated Director of the Institute of Physics in 2018. In 2021, Lambrecht joined the Board of Directors at the Forschungszentrum Jülich.

Awards and honours 
 2005 Société Française de Physique Aimé Cotton Award
 2013 CNRS silver medal
 2016 Gentner-Kastler-Prize
 2019 French Legion of Honour

Selected publications

References 

1967 births
Living people
People from Mülheim
University of Duisburg-Essen alumni
Alumni of Imperial College London
20th-century German physicists
21st-century German physicists
Research directors of the French National Centre for Scientific Research